Edith May may refer to:

 Edith May (poet) (1827–1903), American poet
 Edith May Farr (1864–1956), American botanist 
 Edith Pretty (Edith May Pretty, 1883–1942), English landowner
 Edith May (barge), wooden sailing barge built in 1906